Pierce the Veil is an American rock band from San Diego, California, United States. Formed in 2006, the band was founded by brothers Vic and Mike Fuentes after the disbandment of the group Before Today (formerly Early Times), which was formed out of the San Diego punk rock scene. Other members of the band include Jaime Preciado (bass) and Tony Perry (lead guitar). Pierce the Veil has released five studio albums and has toured worldwide since the release of their debut album, A Flair for the Dramatic in 2007. The band released their second full-length studio album, titled Selfish Machines in 2010. Their third album, Collide with the Sky, was released in 2012, and is their first album under the Fearless Records label. Featuring the hit first single "King for a Day", the album debuted at No. 12 on the Billboard 200. Their fourth album, Misadventures, was released on May 13, 2016. Their fifth album, The Jaws of Life, was released on February 10, 2023.

History

2006–2009: early years and A Flair for the Dramatic 
Pierce the Veil was founded by Mike Fuentes and Vic Fuentes in 2006, after the disbandment of Before Today. The brothers continued to write songs together and eventually came up with enough material for a new full-length album. Still backed by their label, Equal Vision Records, they wrote and recorded an entire album on their own in Seattle, WA with producer Casey Bates. The brothers released the album A Flair for the Dramatic on June 26, 2007, under a new name: Pierce the Veil, which is derived from a song of the same name from Before Today's album, A Celebration of an Ending. Soon after, Pierce the Veil acquired new members Tony Perry (lead guitar) and Jaime Preciado (bass). Pierce the Veil toured vigorously for about 3 months after the release of A Flair for the Dramatic. They have toured with bands such as A Day to Remember, Chiodos, From First to Last, Emery, All Time Low, Sleeping with Sirens, The Devil Wears Prada and Mayday Parade.

In November 2007, Pierce the Veil performed one date on the Vans Warped Tour 2007, and were on the entire tour in 2008. They also played the Bamboozle Left in 2008. Their first headlining tour, called The Delicious Tour, which took place in October–November 2008, featured Breathe Carolina, Four Letter Lie and Emarosa. They ended their record cycle with the Taste of Chaos 2009 tour along with Bring Me the Horizon, Thursday, Four Year Strong and Cancer Bats. Vic and Mike Fuentes with Ayrton Jara confirmed to be included in the new project and supergroup Isles & Glaciers, featuring vocalists Craig Owens of Chiodos and Jonny Craig of Emarosa. The "supergroup" released its first EP titled The Hearts of Lonely People on March 9, 2010. However Isles & Glaciers has broken up, saying "Isles & Glaciers was only a one time thing".

2009–2011: Selfish Machines 

During August 2009, Pierce the Veil announced that they were currently in studio recording new material for their next album. After a few months off the road and building anticipation for their sophomore release, the band moved to Los Angeles to record their album Selfish Machines with Producer Mike Green. Singer and lyricist Vic Fuentes stated, "The title refers to human nature and the animal-like qualities inside all of us that we try and hide, but should just learn to accept. We are all selfish machines and we all have natural tendencies to want, love, and take." Selfish Machines was released on June 21, 2010, under Equal Vision Records, and made it to No. 1 on the Billboard Heatseekers Chart. In support of the release, the band played a number of festivals including Bamboozle Left, South by Southwest, Never Say Never Festival, and the Vans Warped Tour. The band also contributed a cover of Blue Öyster Cult's classic song "(Don't Fear) The Reaper" to the Punk Goes Classic Rock compilation, released on April 27, 2010. They were a part of the Take Action Tour with Attack Attack! that went to New Zealand and Australia, and also played on the Versus Tour in Japan with Confide. They played the "This Is a Family Tour" with Emmure, In Fear and Faith, Of Mice & Men, and Attack Attack!, which lasted until late December 2010.

Pierce the Veil also played at the Fox Theater in Pomona as a surprise appearance as part of the Alternative Press Tour 2010 with bands such as August Burns Red, Bring Me the Horizon, Polar Bear Club, Emarosa, and This Is Hell. On November 1, 2010, the band announced that they will be kicking off 2011 touring with Silverstein, Miss May I, The Chariot, and A Bullet for Pretty Boy on the "Winterizer Tour". Throughout March and April, "The Gamechanger's Tour" with A Day to Remember, Bring Me the Horizon, and label mates We Came as Romans followed. They also co-headlined the second leg of Escape the Fate's headlining tour "The Dead Masquerade". After taking the summer off to spend some more time on writing new material, the band was supposed to head out on their first ever South American Tour supporting Sum 41 in September; however, due to illness of Sum 41's frontman, the tour was cancelled. They finished up the year touring Europe with blessthefall and co-headlined the No Guts No Glory Tour with Miss May I afterwards. They once again contributed to a "Punk Goes..." album, Punk Goes Pop 4, covering the song "Just the Way You Are" by Bruno Mars, which was released on November 21, 2011.

2011–2013: Fearless Records and Collide with the Sky 
On August 23, 2011, Pierce the Veil signed with Fearless Records. On December 22, 2011, a video update revealed in that in early 2012, the band would be going into the studio to record their third studio album. On December 26, 2011, Vic Fuentes announced on the band's Facebook page that the band had finished writing the songs for their third album, which they began writing during the summer and while on tour with Miss May I, Woe Is Me, The Amity Affliction and letlive during November and December, and they would now be choosing a producer to work with on the album in early 2012. On February 27, 2012, The band issued an update on their official Facebook page stating that they have chosen to work with producers Dan Korneff and Kato Khandwala at the House of Loud in New Jersey on their upcoming third album. On April 20, 2012, it was announced that the new album would be titled Collide with the Sky and would be released through Fearless Records on July 17, 2012. On May 17, 2012, the album cover and the track list of the new album were revealed along with the announcement of the band's first ever UK headlining tour in September 2012. The first single from the new album, King for a Day, features Kellin Quinn of Sleeping with Sirens and was released on June 5, 2012. The second single, Bulls in the Bronx, was released three weeks later on June 26, 2012.

In order to promote the album, the band appeared on the Vans Warped Tour from June 16, 2012, to August 5, 2012, playing the event's main stage for the first time. They were regularly joined on stage by Kellin Quinn to perform the song King for a Day. After Warped, Pierce the Veil embarked on their first headlining tour in the UK, selling out almost all of the dates. Their following headlining tour in the US, The Collide with the Sky tour, saw a similar success. They ended the year appearing at No. 33 in Rock Sound magazine's best albums of 2012 list as well as winning nine categories in the best of 2012 reader's poll conducted by Alternative Press, including Best Live Band of the Year, Album of the Year and Artist of the Year. On January 9, 2013, Vic Fuentes released information that he had recently been in the studio writing new songs with Tom Denney.

On January 7, 2013, Pierce the Veil and pop-punk band All Time Low announced that they would be co-headlining the Spring Fever Tour in Spring 2013. Both bands toured across the United States, along with opening acts Mayday Parade and You Me at Six. The tour began on April 11, 2013, and ended on May 12, 2013. Toward the end of the tour, on May 7, 2013, the music video for Pierce the Veil's song "Bulls in the Bronx" was released.

2013–2015: This Is a Wasteland and World Tour 

On September 23, 2013, the band announced plans to release a documentary on November 11 detailing their first world tour. It included live footage from their world tour, three music videos, and additional content. The band released this statement on the documentary: "Our first world tour was absolutely the craziest experience of our lives.. and we filmed EVERYTHING! Follow along as we visit uncharted territories in search of the best shows and thrilling experiences we could absolutely find along the way. This DVD is for the fans and the fans only. Thank you for letting us travel the world and share this adventure with you!" - Vic, Mike, Tony, and Jaime

On October 18, 2013, the band launched pre-orders for their documentary with a new release date of November 25.

On July 21, Vic Fuentes and Kellin Quinn of Sleeping with Sirens announced a co-headlining world concert tour. The tour started on November 5, 2014, in Fresno. They first announced the first North America leg with 20 concerts with support from Beartooth and This Wild Life. A month later, on August 22, 2014, the band confirmed the second leg of the concert tour which took place in Europe. Between March 20, 2015, and April 11, 2015, Pierce the Veil played concerts in the Netherlands, Belgium, Sweden, Germany, and the UK. According to Epitaph Records, all concerts in Europe were sold out. Before heading to Europe the band played a second US leg with support from PVRIS and Mallory Knox.

2015–2018: Misadventures and allegations of sexual misconduct 
Plans for an upcoming album were initially announced on December 23, 2013. In a holiday update, the band announced that they would have a new album coming out in 2014 through Fearless Records. In an article from Oakland Press, the band stated they had started writing new material with Tom Denney while on tour with Mayday Parade, You Me at Six and All Time Low. The band finished writing new music after the winter European tour with Bring Me the Horizon in December 2013.

In an interview with Poppy Reid of The Music Network during the band's appearance at Soundwave Festival in Australia, the band spoke on collaborating with Jenna McDougall of Tonight Alive on a track from their fourth record. In May 2014, Pierce the Veil started pre-production for the new record. On June 5, 2014, Tony Perry and Vic Fuentes announced they would be flying to New Jersey in order to start recording their new album with producer Dan Korneff. In an interview with Alternative Press Vic Fuentes stated that the band was aiming for an early 2015 release date, pushed back from a 2014 release date. The reason for the pushed back release date was due to the band being several weeks behind due to two songs which the band wrote whilst they were recording the new album in the studio with producer Dan Korneff. The band's ambitions for an early 2015 release date did not surface, as the album was again pushed back for a later release. This release date would later be confirmed as May 2016.

On June 18, 2015, the band released "The Divine Zero", the first single from their upcoming fourth studio album.

On March 18, 2016, it was announced the band's eagerly anticipated fourth studio album, Misadventures, would finally be released on May 13 through Fearless Records. The album was produced by Dan Korneff. The band released the second single from the album, "Texas Is Forever" on March 24, 2016.

In November 2017, drummer Mike Fuentes was accused of soliciting nude photos and statutory rape by a young woman. The incidents were have alleged to have occurred roughly a decade prior over the course of several years. The pair allegedly initiated contact on MySpace before meeting for the first time at a Pierce the Veil concert. Fuentes was 24 at the time, while the girl was 16, a legal minor in the state of California. The woman stated they had sex after meeting again at a concert during Warped Tour. The relationship was said to have lasted until she turned 18.

In December 2017, a second woman accused him of requesting nude pictures when she was a minor. She accused him anonymously on Twitter. The woman claimed they first met at Warped Tour in 2008, when she was 14 years old where they exchanged phone numbers. When she turned 15, Fuentes allegedly requested nude photos from her.

In light of the allegations, Fuentes and the rest of the band released a statement later that month, stating that Mike Fuentes was to step down as drummer to "concentrate on his personal life". The band announced a hiatus and cancelled their planned 2018 UK tour with All Time Low. No formal charges were brought publicly against Mike Fuentes for either allegation.

2018–present: hiatus and The Jaws of Life 
On July 5, 2018, vocalist and guitarist Vic Fuentes posted on his social media that he is working on the band's fifth album. In February 2019, the official band Twitter posted that they were still working on the album.

On 13 April 2020, the band uploaded a home rehearsal of their track "Hold On Till May" to YouTube, in light of the COVID-19 pandemic. The performance featured former member Mike Fuentes, however the band did not specify whether he had officially returned as a member of the band. Reaction to Mike Fuentes performing with the band was mixed, with listeners expressing concern on social media over the sexual allegations surrounding him, with the band having yet to address them fully beyond the original 2017 statement. On August 24, 2020, Vic confirmed that Mike had left the band in 2017 and will not be featured on the next album.

On September 1, 2022, the band released the single "Pass the Nirvana". On November 11, 2022, the band released their second new single, "Emergency Contact" and announced that their fifth studio album The Jaws of Life would be released on February 10, 2023.

Musical style
Pierce the Veil's music style has generally been regarded as a mix of post-hardcore, pop punk, experimental rock, emo, and metalcore.

Their debut album A Flair for the Dramatic has been described as a mixture of emo, screamo and progressive rock. According to German music magazine Intro the compositions on the records are "complex" and compared them to artists like Sparta, And You Will Know Us by the Trail of Dead and partly even to Queen.

Their sophomore album, Selfish Machines, was partly influenced by punk music and has been compared to bands like Emarosa, Chiodos, The Used and Alesana. The band was praised by The Morning Call for the band's mix of metal and hardcore punk with the songwriting and melodies of pop music. Their third album, Collide with the Sky, was widely praised for its elements of progressive rock. Their fourth album, Misadventures, leaned more towards pop and pop punk. The album was compared to artists like Atreyu, My Chemical Romance and Panic! at the Disco. The vocals of Vic Fuentes have been compared to Claudio Sanchez of Coheed and Cambria.

The term "mexicore" has also been applied to the band due to the Spanish flair in many of their songs. Vic Fuentes said in an interview with Alternative Press that the band always tries to "incorporate at least a hint of Latin influence in every song." Vic Fuentes described "mexicore" as a "mix of heavy music with a little Spanish feel."

Members
Current
 Vic Fuentes – lead vocals, rhythm guitar, keyboards, piano (2006–present); lead guitar, bass (2006–2007)
 Tony Perry – lead guitar (2007–present)
 Jaime Preciado – bass, backing vocals (2007–present)

Touring
Loniel Robinson – drums (2022–present)
Jesse Barrera – lead guitar (2015) 

Former
 Mike Fuentes – drums (2006–2017); programming (2006–2007)

Timeline

Discography

Studio albums
 A Flair for the Dramatic (2007)
 Selfish Machines (2010)
 Collide with the Sky (2012)
 Misadventures (2016)
 The Jaws of Life (2023)

Awards and nominations

See also
 List of Pierce the Veil concert tours

References

External links

 Official website

 
2006 establishments in California
American post-hardcore musical groups
Emo musical groups from California
Equal Vision Records artists
Fearless Records artists
Kerrang! Awards winners
Musical quartets
Musical groups established in 2006
Musical groups from San Diego
Progressive rock musical groups from California
American punk rock groups
Metalcore musical groups from California